Fortuneleptura romei is a species of beetle in the family Cerambycidae. It was described by Touroult in 2011.

References

Lepturinae
Beetles described in 2011